Wilber Larrick was an American football coach.  He was the head football coach for the Carthage College in Carthage, Illinois, serving for three seasons, from 1902 to 1904, and compiling a record of 3–2–3.

Head coaching record

References

Year of birth missing
Year of death missing
Carthage Firebirds football coaches